Monique Sheelagh Jacquard Simmonds  is a botanist who is deputy keeper of the Jodrell Laboratory at the Royal Botanic Gardens, Kew.

Simmonds earned her BSc at the University of Leeds and her PhD at Birkbeck College, University of London.

References 

Living people
21st-century British botanists
Royal Botanic Gardens, Kew
Alumni of Birkbeck, University of London
Alumni of the University of Leeds
Officers of the Order of the British Empire
Year of birth missing (living people)
British women scientists